Shrek is a 2001 American computer-animated comedy film loosely based on the 1990 children's picture book of the same name by William Steig. Directed by Andrew Adamson and Vicky Jenson (in their feature directorial debuts) and written by Ted Elliott, Terry Rossio, Joe Stillman, and Roger S. H. Schulman, it is the first installment in the Shrek film series. The film stars Mike Myers, Eddie Murphy, Cameron Diaz, and John Lithgow. In the film, an embittered ogre named Shrek (Myers) finds his home in the swamp overrun by fairy tale creatures banished by the obsessive ruler Lord Farquaad (Lithgow). With the help of Donkey (Murphy), Shrek makes a pact with Farquaad to rescue Princess Fiona (Diaz) in exchange for regaining control of his swamp.

After purchasing rights to Steig's book in 1991, Steven Spielberg sought to produce a traditionally-animated film adaptation, but John H. Williams convinced him to bring the project to the newly founded DreamWorks in 1994. Jeffrey Katzenberg, along with Williams and Aron Warner, began development on Shrek in 1995, immediately following the studio's purchase of the rights from Spielberg. Chris Farley was cast as the voice for the title character, recording most of the required dialogue, but died in 1997 before his work on the film was finished; Myers was hired to replace him, and gave Shrek his iconic Scottish accent. The film was initially intended to be created using motion capture, but after poor test results, the studio hired Pacific Data Images to complete the final computer animation. Shrek parodies other fairy tale adaptations, primarily animated Disney films.

Shrek premiered at the Mann Village Theatre In Westwood, and was later shown at the 2001 Cannes Film Festival, where it competed for the Palme d'Or, making it the first animated film since Disney's Peter Pan (1953) to be chosen to do so. The film was theatrically released by DreamWorks Pictures in the United States on May 18, 2001, and grossed over $491 million worldwide, becoming the fourth highest-grossing film of 2001. It was widely praised by critics for its animation, voice performances, soundtrack, writing and humor, which they noted catered to both adults and children. Shrek was nominated for the Academy Award for Best Adapted Screenplay and won for Best Animated Feature. It earned six nominations at the British Academy of Film and Television Arts (BAFTA), winning for Best Adapted Screenplay.

The film's success helped establish DreamWorks Animation as a competitor to Pixar in feature film computer animation. Three sequels have been released—Shrek 2 (2004), Shrek the Third (2007), and Shrek Forever After (2010)—along with two spin-off films—Puss in Boots (2011) and Puss in Boots: The Last Wish (2022)—and other productions in the Shrek franchise. It is also regarded as one of the most influential animated films of the 2000s. The United States Library of Congress selected Shrek for preservation in the National Film Registry in 2020.

Plot

Shrek is an anti-social and highly-territorial ogre who loves the solitude of his swamp. His life is interrupted after the dwarfish Lord Farquaad of Duloc exiles a vast number of fairy-tale creatures, who inadvertently end up in the swamp. Angered by the intrusion, Shrek decides to visit Farquaad and demand they be moved elsewhere. He reluctantly allows the talkative Donkey, who was exiled as well, to tag along and guide him to Duloc.

Meanwhile, Farquaad is presented with the Magic Mirror, who tells him that he must marry a princess in order to become king. Farquaad chooses Princess Fiona, who is imprisoned in a castle guarded by a dragon. Unwilling to rescue Fiona himself, he organizes a tournament in which the winner will receive the "privilege" of performing the task on his behalf. When Shrek and Donkey arrive at Duloc, Farquaad announces that whoever kills the ogre will be crowned the victor; however, Shrek and Donkey defeat Farquaad's knights with relative ease. Amused, Farquaad proclaims them champions, and agrees to relocate the fairy-tale creatures if Shrek rescues Fiona.

Shrek and Donkey travel to the castle and are attacked by the dragon. Shrek locates Fiona, who is appalled by his lack of romanticism; they flee the castle after rescuing Donkey. When Shrek removes his helmet and reveals he is an ogre, Fiona stubbornly refuses to go to Duloc, demanding Farquaad arrive in person to save her; Shrek carries her against her will. That night, after setting up camp and with Fiona alone in a cave, Shrek confides with Donkey about his frustration with being feared and rejected by others over his appearance. Fiona overhears this and decides to be kind to Shrek. The next day, the three are harassed by Robin Hood and his band of Merry Men, with Fiona dispatching them easily using martial arts. Shrek becomes impressed with Fiona, and they begin to fall in love.

When the trio nears Duloc, Fiona takes shelter in a windmill for the evening. Donkey later enters alone and discovers that Fiona has transformed into an ogre. She explains she has been cursed since childhood, forced to transform into an ogre every night, and changing back at sunrise. She tells Donkey that only "true love's kiss" will break the spell and change her to "love's true form". Meanwhile, Shrek is about to confess his feelings to Fiona, when he overhears Fiona referring to herself as an "ugly beast". Believing that she is talking about him, Shrek angrily leaves and returns the next morning with Farquaad. Confused and hurt by Shrek's abrupt hostility, Fiona accepts Farquaad's marriage proposal and requests they be married before nightfall.

Shrek abandons Donkey and returns to his now-vacated swamp. He quickly realizes that despite his privacy, he feels miserable and misses Fiona. Donkey returns to the swamp and confronts Shrek, explaining that the "ugly beast" Fiona was referring to was someone else, and urges him to express his feelings to Fiona before she marries. The two reconcile and quickly travel to Duloc by riding Dragon, who Donkey has befriended. Shrek interrupts the wedding just before the ceremony completes, and tells Fiona that Farquaad is only marrying her to become king. The sun sets as Fiona transforms into an ogre in front of everyone, causing Shrek to understand what he overheard. Outraged and disgusted, Farquaad orders Shrek executed and Fiona detained. The two are saved when Dragon, alongside Donkey, break in and devour Farquaad. Shrek and Fiona profess their love and share a kiss. Though Fiona's curse is broken, this permanently makes her an ogre against her expectations, though Shrek reassures her that he still finds her beautiful. They marry in the swamp with fairy-tale creatures in attendance, then leave for their honeymoon.

Voice cast

 Mike Myers as:
Shrek
One of the Three Blind Mice
 Eddie Murphy as Donkey
 Cameron Diaz as Princess Fiona
 John Lithgow as Lord Farquaad
 Vincent Cassel as "Monsieur" Robin Hood
 Conrad Vernon as Gingerbread Man
 Chris Miller as:
Magic Mirror
Geppetto
 Cody Cameron as:
Pinocchio
The Three Little Pigs
 Simon J. Smith as Blind Mouse
 Christopher Knights as:
Thelonius
One of the Three Blind Mice
 Aron Warner as Big Bad Wolf
 Jim Cummings as Captain of the Guards
 Kathleen Freeman as Old Woman (Donkey's ex-owner) This was Freeman's last film role before her death.
 Andrew Adamson as Duloc Mascot (a man dressed in a suit that looks like Lord Farquaad)
 Bobby Block as Baby Bear from the Three Bears
 Michael Galasso as Peter Pan

Production

Development
At the time DreamWorks was founded, producer John H. Williams got hold of the book from his children and when he brought it to DreamWorks, it caught Jeffrey Katzenberg's attention and the studio decided to make it into a film. Recounting the inspiration of making the film, Williams said: 
After buying the rights to the film, Katzenberg quickly put it in active development in November 1995. Steven Spielberg had thought about making a traditionally animated film adaptation of the book before, when he bought the rights to the book in 1991 before the founding of DreamWorks, where Bill Murray would play Shrek and Steve Martin would play Donkey. In the beginning of production, co-director Andrew Adamson refused to be intimidated by Katzenberg and had an argument with him about how much the film should appeal to adults. Katzenberg wanted both audiences, but he deemed some of Adamson's ideas, such as adding sexual jokes and Guns N' Roses music to the soundtrack, to be too outrageous. Adamson and Kelly Asbury joined in 1997 to co-direct the film. However, Asbury left a year later for work on the 2002 film Spirit: Stallion of the Cimarron, and was replaced with story artist Vicky Jenson, although Asbury would later co-direct the sequel. Both Adamson and Jenson decided to work on the film in half, so the crew could at least know whom to go to with specific detail questions about the film's sequences; "We both ended up doing a lot of everything," Adamson said. "We're both kinda control freaks, and we both wanted to do everything."

Some early sketches of Shrek's house were done between 1996 and 1997 using Photoshop, with the sketches showing Shrek first living in a garbage dump near a human village called Wart Creek. It was also thought one time that he lived with his parents and kept rotting fish in his bedroom. Donkey was modeled after Pericles (born 1994; also known as Perry), a real miniature donkey from Barron Park in Palo Alto, California. Raman Hui, supervising animator of Shrek, stated that Fiona "wasn't based on any real person" and he did many different sketches for her. He had done over 100 sculptures of Fiona before the directors chose the final design. In early development, the art directors visited Hearst Castle, Stratford upon Avon, and Dordogne for inspiration. Art Director Douglas Rogers visited a magnolia plantation in Charleston, South Carolina for inspiration of Shrek's swamp. Planned characters not used in the film include Goldilocks and Sleeping Beauty.

During production, animators who failed while working on other projects, such as The Prince of Egypt, were often sent to work on Shrek. The reassignment was known as being "Shreked" and being sent to "the Gulag".

Casting
Nicolas Cage was initially offered the role of Shrek but he turned it down because he did not want to look like an ogre. In 2013, Cage explained furthermore: "When you're drawn, in a way it says more about how children are going to see you than anything else, and I so care about that."

Chris Farley was initially hired to voice Shrek, and he had recorded nearly all of the dialogue for the character, but died before completing the project. A story reel featuring a sample of Farley's recorded dialogue was leaked to the public in August 2015. DreamWorks then re-cast the voice role to Mike Myers, who insisted on a complete script rewrite, to leave no traces of Farley's version of Shrek. According to Myers, he wanted to voice the character "for two reasons: I wanted the opportunity to work with Jeffrey Katzenberg; and [the book is] a great story about accepting yourself for who you are."

After Myers had completed providing the voice for the character over the course of 1999 and the film was well into production, a rough cut of the movie was shown to him in February 2000. Myers asked to re-record all of his lines with a Scottish accent, similar to that his mother used when she told him bedtime stories and also used for his roles in other films, such as So I Married an Axe Murderer and Austin Powers: The Spy Who Shagged Me. According to the DVD commentary, he had also tried using a Lothar of the Hill People accent and a Canadian accent. After hearing the alternative, Katzenberg agreed to redo scenes in the film, saying, "It was so good we took $4M worth of animation out and did it again." Myers disputed the cost, saying "it didn't cost the studio 'millions of dollars'," as rumored. "What it meant is instead of me going in for ten sessions, I went in for twenty sessions. I got paid the same." Because of Myers voicing the character, more ideas began to come. There were clearer story points, fresher gags and comedy bits. "I got a letter from Spielberg thanking me so much for caring about the character," Myers said. "And he said the Scottish accent had improved the movie."

Another person planned to voice a character in the film was Janeane Garofalo, who was set to star alongside Farley as Princess Fiona. However, she was fired from the project for unexplained reasons. Years later, Garofalo stated "I was never told why [I was fired]. I assume because I sound like a man sometimes? I don't know why. Nobody told me ... But, you know, the movie didn't do anything, so who cares?"

Animation
Shrek was originally set up to be a live-action/CG animation hybrid with background plate miniature sets and the main characters composited into the scene as motion-captured computer graphics, using an ExpertVision Hires Falcon 10 camera system to capture and apply realistic human movement to the characters. A sizable crew was hired to run a test, and after a year and a half of R & D, the test was finally screened in May 1997. The results were not satisfactory, with Katzenberg stating "It looked terrible, it didn't work, it wasn't funny, and we didn't like it." The studio then turned to its production partners at Pacific Data Images (PDI), who began production with the studio in 1998 and helped Shrek get to its final, computer-animated look. At this time, Antz was still in production at the studio and effects supervisor Ken Bielenberg was asked by Aron Warner "to start development for Shrek". Similar to previous PDI films, PDI used its own proprietary software (like the Fluid Animation System) for its animated movies. For some elements, however, it also took advantage of some of the powerhouse animation software on the market. This is particularly true with Maya, which PDI used for most of its dynamic cloth animation and for the hair of Fiona and Farquaad.

"We did a lot of work on character and set-up, and then kept changing the set up while we were doing the animation," Hui noted. "In Antz, we had a facial system that gave us all the facial muscles under the skin. In Shrek, we applied that to whole body. So, if you pay attention to Shrek when he talks, you see that when he opens his jaw, he forms a double chin, because we have the fat and the muscles underneath. That kind of detail took us a long time to get right." One of the most difficult parts of creating the film was making Donkey's fur flow smoothly so that it did not look like that of a Chia Pet. This fell into the hands of the surfacing animators, who used flow controls within a complex shader to provide the fur with many attributes (ability to change directions, lie flat, swirl, etc.). It was then the job of the visual effects group, led by Ken Bielenberg, to make the fur react to environment conditions. Once the technology was mastered, it could be applied to many aspects of the movie, including grass, moss, beards, eyebrows, and even threads on Shrek's tunic. Making human hair realistic was different from Donkey's fur, requiring a separate rendering system and much attention from the lighting and visual effects teams.

Shrek has 31 sequences, with 1,288 total shots. Aron Warner said that the creators "envisioned a magical environment that you could immerse yourself into". Shrek includes 36 separate in-film locations to make the world of the film, which DreamWorks claimed was more than any previous computer-animated feature. In-film locations were finalized and, as demonstrated by past DreamWorks animated movies, color and mood was of the utmost importance. The animation was completed in 2000.

Music

Shrek is the third DreamWorks animated film (and the only film in the Shrek series) to have Harry Gregson-Williams team up with John Powell to compose the score following Antz (1998) and Chicken Run (2000). Powell was left out to compose scores for later Shrek films with Gregson-Williams due to a conflict. The score was recorded at Abbey Road Studios by Nick Wollage and Slamm Andrews, with the latter mixing it at Media Ventures and Patricia Sullivan-Fourstar handling mastering.

Shrek introduced a new element to give the film a unique feel. The film used pop music and other Oldies to make the story more forward. Covers of songs like "On the Road Again" and "Try a Little Tenderness" were integrated in the film's score. The band Smash Mouth's song "All Star" gained massive popularity due to its usage in the film's opening credits. As the film was about to be completed, Katzenberg suggested to the filmmakers to redo the film's ending to "go out with a big laugh"; instead of ending the film with just a storybook closing over Shrek and Fiona as they ride off into the sunset, they decided to add a song "I'm a Believer" covered by Smash Mouth and show all the fairytale creatures in the film.

Although Rufus Wainwright's version of the song "Hallelujah" appeared in the soundtrack album, it was John Cale's version that appeared in the film; in a radio interview, Rufus Wainwright suggested that his version of "Hallelujah" did not appear in the film due to the "glass ceiling" he was hitting because of his sexuality. An alternative explanation is that, although the filmmakers wanted Cale's version for the film, licensing issues prevented its use in the soundtrack album, because Wainwright was an artist for DreamWorks but Cale was not.

Cultural references
In many places the film references classic movies, predominantly those by Disney. When Tinker Bell falls on Donkey and he says "I can fly" and people around including the Three Little Pigs say "He can fly, he can fly"; this is a reference to Disney's Peter Pan. Another scene that references Disney media is one in which Donkey says, while flying, "You might have seen a house fly, maybe even a super fly, but I bet you ain't never seen a Donkey fly!". This scene is a reference to the Disney film Dumbo. The scene where Fiona is singing to the blue bird is a reference to Snow White and the Seven Dwarfs. The transformation scene at the end of the film references Disney's Beauty and the Beast.

When Shrek crosses the bridge to the Castle and says, "That'll do, Donkey, that'll do", this is a reference to the movie Babe. The scene where Princess Fiona is fighting the Merry Men is a lengthy reference to the film The Matrix. At the end of the film, the Gingerbread Man at the end with a crutch (and one leg) says "God bless us, everyone" which is a reference to Tiny Tim in A Christmas Carol.

In the scene where the Magic Mirror gives Lord Farquaad the option to marry three princesses, it parodies popular American television show The Dating Game featuring: Cinderella and Snow White. In addition, Lord Farquaad's theme park style kingdom Duloc heavily mimics Disneyland, even in so far as parodying the famous "It's a Small World" musical ride in the scene with the singing puppets. It has been suggested that Lord Farquaad himself is an unflattering parody of then-Disney CEO Michael Eisner, whom producer Katzenberg reportedly dislikes.

Release

Marketing
In 2000, IMAX released CyberWorld onto its branded large-screen theaters. It was a compilation film that featured stereoscopic conversions of various animated shorts and sequences, including the bar sequence in Antz. DreamWorks was so impressed by the technology used for the sequence's "stereoscopic translation", that the studio and IMAX decided to plan a big-screen 3D version of Shrek. The film would have been re-released during the Christmas season of 2001, or the following summer, after its conventional 2D release. The re-release would have also included new sequences and an alternate ending. Plans for this was dropped due to "creative changes" instituted by DreamWorks and resulted in a loss of $1.18 million, down from IMAX's profit of $3.24 million.

Radio Disney was told not to allow any ads for the film to air on the station, stating, "Due to recent initiatives with The Walt Disney Company, we are being asked not to align ourselves promotionally with this new release Shrek. Stations may accept spot dollars only in individual markets." The restriction was later relaxed to allow ads for the film's soundtrack album onto the network.

On May 7, 2001, Burger King began promotions for the film, giving out a selection of nine exclusive Candy Caddies based on the Shrek characters, in Big Kids Meal and Kids Meal orders. Ice cream chain Baskin-Robbins also ran an 8-week promotion of the film, selling products such as Shrek's Hot Sludge Sundae, a combination of Oreo Cookies 'n Cream ice cream, hot fudge, crushed chocolate cookies, whipped cream and squiggly gummy worms, and Shrek Freeze Frame Cake, featuring an image of Shrek and Donkey framed by sunflowers. This was to support the film's DVD/VHS release.

Home media
Shrek was released by DreamWorks Home Entertainment on VHS and DVD on November 2, 2001. It surpassed Star Wars: Episode I – The Phantom Menaces record for becoming the fastest-selling DVD ever, selling 2.5 million copies within the first three days of release. Another 4.5 million copies were sold on VHS in the same timespan, making it the biggest opening weekend in retail video since The Lion King in 1995. Both releases included Shrek in the Swamp Karaoke Dance Party, a 3-minute musical short film, that takes up right after Shreks ending, with film's characters performing a medley of modern pop songs.

Coincidentally, the film was released on video the same day that Pixar's Monsters, Inc. hit theaters. Since videos were traditionally released on Tuesdays, Disney's executives did not receive this well, saying that the move "seemed like an underhanded attempt to siphon off some of their film's steam". DreamWorks responded that it "simply shifted the release to a Friday to make it more of an event and predicted that it and other studios would do so more frequently with important films." Monsters, Inc. earned that weekend more than $62 million, breaking the record for an animated film, while Shreks video release made more than $100 million, and eventually became the biggest selling DVD at the time with over 5.5 million sales. This broke the record previously held by Gladiator, another DreamWorks film. Shrek generated more than $420 million in revenue for DreamWorks on DVD and VHS, and has sold more than 21 million copies of the 23 million shipped by January 2002. Worldwide, more than 10 million Shrek DVDs have been sold by that point.

A 3D version of the film was released on Blu-ray 3D by Paramount Home Entertainment on December 1, 2010, along with its sequels, and a regular 2D Blu-ray boxset of the series was released six days later.

In commemoration of the film's 20th anniversary, an Ultra HD Blu-ray edition was released on May 11, 2021, by Universal Pictures Home Entertainment.

Reception and legacy

Box office
Shrek opened on around 6,000 screens across 3,587 theaters; eleven of them showed the film digitally. This was the first time that DreamWorks had shown one of its films digitally. The film earned $11.6 million on its first day and $42.3 million on its opening weekend, topping the box office for the weekend and averaging $11,805 from 3,587 theaters. In its second weekend, due to the Memorial Day Weekend holiday, the film gained 0.3 percent to $42.5 million and $55.2 million over the four-day weekend, resulting in an overall 30 percent gain. Despite this, the film finished in second place behind Pearl Harbor and had an average of $15,240 from expanding to 3,623 sites. In its third weekend, the film retreated 34 percent to $28.2 million for a $7,695 average from expanding to 3,661 theaters. The film closed on December 6, 2001, after grossing $267.7 million domestically, along with $216.7 million overseas, for a worldwide total of $484.4 million. Produced on a $60 million budget, the film was a huge box office smash and is the fourth highest-grossing film of 2001.

Shrek became the highest-grossing animated film ever to be released in Australia, passing the mark set by The Lion King in 1994. In the United Kingdom, Shrek regained the top spot at the British box office after being beaten out the previous week by Lara Croft: Tomb Raider, earning a $20.3 million since its opening in the UK.

Critical response
Its critical consensus reads, "While simultaneously embracing and subverting fairy tales, the irreverent Shrek also manages to tweak Disney's nose, provide a moral message to children, and offer viewers a funny, fast-paced ride." Metacritic (which uses a weighted average) assigned Shrek a score of 84 out of 100 based on 34 critics, indicating "universal acclaim". Audiences polled by CinemaScore gave the film an average grade of "A" on an A+ to F scale.

Roger Ebert praised the film, giving it four stars out of a possible four and describing it as "jolly and wicked, filled with sly in-jokes and yet somehow possessing a heart". USA Todays Susan Wloszczyna praised Eddie Murphy's performance, stating it "gives the comic performance of his career, aided by sensational digital artistry, as he brays for the slightly neurotic motormouth". Richard Schickel of Time also enjoyed Murphy's role, stating "No one has ever made a funnier jackass of himself than Murphy." Peter Rainer of New York magazine liked the script, also stating "The animation, directed by Andrew Adamson and Vicky Jenson, is often on the same wriggly, giggly level as the script, although the more "human" characters, such as Princess Fiona and Lord Farquaad, are less interesting than the animals and creatures—a common pitfall in animated films of all types." Peter Travers of Rolling Stone wrote "Shrek is a world-class charmer that could even seduce the Academy when it hands out the first official animation Oscar next year." James Berardinelli of ReelViews gave the film three and a half stars out of four, saying "Shrek is not a guilty pleasure for sophisticated movie-goers; it is, purely and simply, a pleasure." Kenneth Turan of the Los Angeles Times wrote "The witty, fractured fairy tale Shrek has a solid base of clever writing." Lisa Schwarzbaum of Entertainment Weekly gave the film an A−, saying "A kind of palace coup, a shout of defiance, and a coming of age for DreamWorks." Jay Boyar of the Orlando Sentinel wrote "It's a pleasure to be able to report that the movie both captures and expands upon the book's playful spirit of deconstruction."

Steven Rosen of The Denver Post wrote "DreamWorks Pictures again proves a name to trust for imaginative, funny animated movies that delight kids and adults equally." Susan Stark of The Detroit News gave the film four out of four stars, saying "Swift, sweet, irreverent, rangy and as spirited in the writing and voice work as it is splendid in design." Jami Bernard of the New York Daily News gave the film four out of four stars, saying "The brilliance of the voice work, script, direction and animation all serve to make Shrek an adorable, infectious work of true sophistication." Rene Rodriguez gave the film three out of four stars, calling it "a gleefully fractured fairy tale that never becomes cynical or crass". Elvis Mitchell of The New York Times gave the film four out of five stars, saying "Beating up on the irritatingly dainty Disney trademarks is nothing new; it's just that it has rarely been done with the demolition-derby zest of Shrek." William Steig, the author of the original book, and his wife Jeanne Steig also enjoyed the film, stating "We all went sort of expecting to hate it, thinking, 'What has Hollywood done to it?' But we loved it. We were afraid it would be too sickeningly cute and, instead, Bill just thought they did a wonderful, witty job of it."

John Anderson of Newsday wrote "The kind of movie that will entertain everyone of every age and probably for ages to come." Jay Carr of The Boston Globe wrote "In an era when much on film seems old, Shrek seems new and fresh and clever." Stephen Hunter of The Washington Post gave the film five out of five stars, saying "Despite all its high-tech weirdness, it is really that most perdurable of human constructions, a tale told well and true." Joe Baltake of The Sacramento Bee wrote that it "isn't so much a fractured spoof of everything Disney, but actually a Monty Python flick for kids – kids of all ages". Andrew Sarris of The New York Observer wrote "What gives Shrek its special artistic distinction is its witty and knowingly sassy dialogue, delivered by vocally charismatic performers whose voices remind us of their stellar screen personae in live-action movies." Lisa Alspector of the Chicago Reader wrote "This romantic fantasy complicates the roles of beauty and beast, making it hard to guess what form a sensitive resolution will take." Joe Morgenstern of The Wall Street Journal wrote "The charms of Shrek, which is based on the children's book by William Steig, go far beyond in-jokes for adults." John Zebrowski of The Seattle Times gave the film three out of four stars, saying "The movie is helped immensely by its cast, who carry it through some of the early, sluggish scenes. But this is Murphy's movie. Donkey gets most of the good lines, and Murphy hits every one."

A mixed review came from Mark Caro of the Chicago Tribune, who gave the film two and a half stars out of four and compared it to Toy Story 2, which he said "had a higher in-jokes/laughs ratio without straining to demonstrate its hipness or to evoke heartfelt emotions". On the more negative side, Michael Atkinson of The Village Voice said he was "desperately avoiding the risk of even a half-second of boredom", and said "the movie is wall-to-window-to-door noise, babbling, and jokes (the first minute sees the first fart gag), and demographically it's a hard-sell shotgun spray." Christy Lemire of the Associated Press described Shrek as a "90-minute onslaught of in-jokes", and said while it "strives to have a heart" with "a message about beauty coming from within", "somehow [the message] rings hollow". Anthony Lane of The New Yorker said, despite the film "cunning the rendering of surfaces, there's still something flat and charmless in the digital look, and most of the pleasure rises not from the main romance but from the quick, incidental gags."

Accolades
At the 74th Academy Awards, Shrek won the first ever Academy Award for Best Animated Feature, beating Monsters, Inc. and Jimmy Neutron: Boy Genius. It was also the first animated film to be nominated for Best Adapted Screenplay. Entertainment Weekly put it on its end-of-the-decade, "best-of" list, saying, "Prince Charming? So last millennium. This decade, fairy-tale fans – and Princess Fiona – fell for a fat and flatulent Ogre. Now, that's progress." It was also nominated for The Golden Globe Award for Best Motion Picture – Musical or Comedy.

Shrek was also nominated for 6 BAFTA Awards, including the BAFTA Award for Best Film. Eddie Murphy became the first actor to ever receive a BAFTA nomination for a voice-over performance. The film was also nominated for Best Visual Effects, Best Sound, Best Film Music, and won the BAFTA Award for Best Adapted Screenplay. Shrek was nominated for a dozen Annie Awards from ASIFA-Hollywood, and won eight Annies including Best Animated Feature and Outstanding Individual Achievement for Directing in an Animated Feature Production.

In June 2008, the American Film Institute revealed its "Ten top Ten"; the best ten films in ten "classic" American film genres—after polling over 1,500 people from the creative community Shrek was acknowledged as the eighth best film in the animated genre, and the only non-Disney·Pixar film in the Top 10. Shrek was also ranked second in a Channel 4 poll of the "100 Greatest Family Films", losing out on the top spot to E.T. the Extra-Terrestrial. In 2005, Shrek came sixth in Channel 4's 100 Greatest Cartoons poll behind The Simpsons, Tom and Jerry, South Park, Toy Story and Family Guy. In November 2009, the character, Lord Farquaad, was listed No. 14 in IGN UK's "Top 15 Fantasy Villains". In 2006, it was ranked third on Bravo's 100 funniest films list. The film's title character was awarded his own star on the Hollywood Walk of Fame in May 2010.

American Film Institute recognition:
 AFI's 100 Years...100 Heroes & Villains:
 Shrek – Nominated Hero
 AFI's 100 Years...100 Songs:
 I'm a Believer – Nominated
 AFI's 100 Years...100 Movies (10th Anniversary Edition) – Nominated
 AFI's 10 Top 10 – No. 8 Animated film

Festivals
Shrek premiered at the 2001 Cannes Film Festival, where it competed for the Palme d'Or, making it the first animated film since Disney's Peter Pan (1953) to be chosen to do so.

Cultural impact
Previous films and TV shows, such as Fractured Fairy Tales and The Princess Bride, have parodied the traditional fairy tale. Shrek had a significant impact that influenced a later generation of mainstream animated films, receiving recognition for being one of the most influential from the 2000s. Particularly after Shrek 2, animated films began to incorporate more pop culture references and end-film musical numbers. Such elements can be seen in films like Robots, Chicken Little and Doogal. It also inspired a number of computer animated films which also spoofed fairy tales, or other related story genres, often including adult-oriented humor, most of which were not nearly as successful as Shrek, such as Happily N'Ever After, Igor, Hoodwinked! and Enchanted  In 2020, the United States Library of Congress selected Shrek to be preserved in the National Film Registry for being "culturally, historically, or aesthetically significant".

Other media

Several video game adaptations of the film have been published on various game console platforms, including Shrek (2001), Shrek: Hassle at the Castle (2002), Shrek: Extra Large (2002), Shrek: Super Party (2002) and Shrek SuperSlam (2005). Shrek was also included as a bonus unlockable character in the video game Tony Hawk's Underground 2 (2004).

In 2003, Dark Horse Comics released a three-issue mini-series comic book adaptation of Shrek which was written by Mark Evanier, and the issues were later compiled into a trade paperback.

A musical version, based on the film, with music by Jeanine Tesori and a book and lyrics by David Lindsay-Abaire, opened on Broadway on December 14, 2008, and closed January 3, 2010, running for a total of 441 performances. It starred Brian d'Arcy James in the title role, Sutton Foster as Princess Fiona, Christopher Sieber as Lord Farquaad, Daniel Breaker as Donkey, and John Tartaglia as Pinocchio. The Broadway production was recorded and released on DVD, Blu-ray and digital media. A North American Tour opened July 25, 2010, in Chicago. A London production opened in the West End on June 7, 2011. The musical received many Tony Award nominations and won the 2009 Tony Award for Best Costume Design. It received five Laurence Olivier Award nominations including Best New Musical.

A shot-for-shot fan remake titled Shrek Retold was released through 3GI Industries on November 29, 2018. The project was a collaboration of 200 filmmakers and mixes live action, hand drawn animation, Flash animation, CGI and various other art forms to recreate the film. The film is available on YouTube for free.

Sequels and spin-offs

Three sequels were released over the years – the Oscar-nominated Shrek 2 in 2004, Shrek the Third in 2007, and Shrek Forever After in 2010. Shrek 2 was the only one to receive similar acclaim from critics, though all three sequels were commercially successful. Shrek the Halls (2007) and Scared Shrekless (2010) were released as holiday-themed short films. A spin-off prequel film entitled Puss in Boots, centered on the titular character's life before his debut in Shrek 2, was released in 2011, while a sequel, titled Puss in Boots: The Last Wish and set after the events of Shrek Forever After, was released in 2022. A fifth feature film was originally planned during the development of Shrek Forever After, but the idea was later abandoned by DreamWorks Animation CEO Jeffrey Katzenberg. Leading up to NBCUniversal's planned acquisition of DreamWorks Animation in 2016, it was announced that a fifth Shrek film would be released in 2019. On November 6, 2018, Variety reported that Chris Meledandri had been tasked to reboot both Shrek and Puss in Boots, with the original cast potentially returning to reprise their roles. While cast members reported that a script was completed for a fifth Shrek film, development stalled and future plans have yet to be officially announced.

See also
Shrek fandom

References

Bibliography

External links
 
  at DreamWorks
 
 

2000s adventure comedy films
2000s American animated films
2000s English-language films
2000s fantasy adventure films
2000s fantasy comedy films
2000s parody films
2001 comedy films
2001 computer-animated films
2001 fantasy films
2001 films
American buddy comedy films
American adventure comedy films
American computer-animated films
American fantasy comedy films
American parody films
Animated buddy films
Animated films about animals
Animated films based on children's books
Best Animated Feature Academy Award winners
Best Animated Feature Annie Award winners
Best Animated Feature Broadcast Film Critics Association Award winners
Brothers Grimm
Ogres in animated film
DreamWorks Animation animated films
DreamWorks Pictures films
Fairy tale parody films
Films about curses
Films about royalty
Films about weddings
Films about witchcraft
Films about shapeshifting
Films directed by Andrew Adamson
Films directed by Vicky Jenson
Films produced by Aron Warner
Films produced by John H. Williams
Films produced by Jeffrey Katzenberg
Films scored by Harry Gregson-Williams
Films scored by John Powell
Films set in the Middle Ages
Films whose writer won the Best Adapted Screenplay BAFTA Award
Films adapted into plays
Films adapted into comics
Films with screenplays by Joe Stillman
Films with screenplays by Ted Elliott
Films with screenplays by Terry Rossio
Internet memes
Shrek films
Animated films about dragons
Disney parodies
3D re-releases
2001 directorial debut films
United States National Film Registry films
American animated feature films